Gay is a town in Orenburg Oblast, Russia, located  east of Orenburg, the administrative center of the oblast. As of the 2010 Census, its population was 38,301.

History
It was founded in 1958 as an industrial settlement. Urban-type settlement status was granted to it in 1965, and town status in 1979.

Administrative and municipal status
Within the framework of administrative divisions, Gay serves as the administrative center of Gaysky District, even though it is not a part of it. As an administrative division, it is, together with one rural locality (the settlement of Kalinovka), incorporated separately as the Town of Gay—an administrative unit with the status equal to that of the districts. As a municipal division, the territories of the Town of Gay and of Gaysky District are incorporated as Gaysky Urban Okrug. Prior to June 1, 2015, the Town of Gay was incorporated as Gay Urban Okrug, separately from Gaysky Municipal District.

Coat of arms
The coat of arms of Gay states: "Remember the Past. Believe in the Future."

References

Notes

Sources

Further reading
 (V. G. Altov. Cities and towns of Orenburg Oblast). Chelyabinsk, Yuzhno-Uralskoye Publishing, 1974.

External links

Official website of Gay 
Gay Business Directory 

Cities and towns in Orenburg Oblast
Populated places established in 1958
1958 establishments in Russia